The Mozambique national cricket team is the men's team that represents Mozambique in international cricket. They are administered by the Mozambican Cricket Association which became International Cricket Council (ICC) member as an affiliate member in 2003, since 2017 they are an associate member. Mozambique is also a member of the Africa Cricket Association. The Mozambique national cricket team has competed in the World Cricket League Africa Region, Cricket World Cup and the ICC Africa Twenty20 Championship.

History
Mozambique became an affiliate member of the International Cricket Council in 2003 and then an associate member in 2017 when the affiliate status was scrapped.

50 over cricket

2003
Their international debut came the following year, when they played in the African Affiliates championship which was the first stage of qualifying for the 2007 Cricket World Cup. They would finish in 6th place after defeating only Rwanda.

2006
Mozambique, as a member of the African Cricket Association, competes in the World Cricket League Africa Region which is a 50 over competition for African countries that aren't full member of the ICC. For this edition, they competed in the third division as they drawn to meet Sierra Leone, Morocco and Rwanda. In the opening match against Sierra Leone, they scored a six wicket win after they bowled out the opposition for only 197. In return, Kaleem Shah top scored with 55 to give the team their first up victory. Kaleem Shah scored the first century of the tournament in the next game against Morocco to get the team to 275 from 50 overs. Morocco in return could only muster up a score of 196 with Shah being the best bowler. The final group game saw Mozambique win the match against Rwanda by 112 runs to finish on top of pool 2. In the semi-final stage, they took on Ghana and Zainul Patel dominated the bowling with 4 wickets to help in getting the team through to the final. In the final game of the tournament, top scorer Kaleem Shah top scored in the final with him scoring 77 in the 89 run victory to move Mozambique to the next division.

Division Two was held in Tanzania with five teams competing for a spot in Division 1. For Mozambique, they had to compete against Botswana, Nigeria, Tanzania and Zambia.

2018-Present
In April 2018, the ICC decided to grant full Twenty20 International (T20I) status to all its members. Therefore, all Twenty20 matches played between Mozambique and other ICC members since 1 January 2019 have been full T20I matches. 

Mozambique played their first T20I on 6 November 2019, against Malawi, during the 2019 T20 Kwacha Cup; they lost by three wickets with two balls left.

Tournament history

World Cricket League

 2008: Division Five 8th place

World Cricket League Africa Region

 2006: Division Three 1st place, Division Two 3rd place
 2008: Division Two 4th place

Records and Statistics 

International Match Summary — Mozambique
 
Last updated 9 December 2022

Twenty20 International 

 Highest team total: 209/5 v Cameroon on 3 November 2021 at Gahanga International Cricket Stadium, Kigali.
 Highest individual score: 104, Francisco Couana v Cameroon on 3 November 2021 at Gahanga International Cricket Stadium, Kigali.
 Best individual bowling figures: 5/19, Francisco Couana v Cameroon on 3 November 2021 at Gahanga International Cricket Stadium, Kigali.

Most T20I runs for Mozambique

Most T20I wickets for Mozambique 

T20I record versus other nations

Records complete to T20I #1949. Last updated 9 December 2022.

Other records
For a list of selected international matches played by Mozambique, see Cricket Archive.

See also
 List of Mozambique Twenty20 International cricketers

References

Cricket in Mozambique
National cricket teams
Cricket
Mozambique in international cricket